Edward Allen Adler is an American businessman and physicist, who as of 2017 was the vice president of Enterprise Technology Strategy for The Boeing Company and also an Elected Fellow of the American Physical Society.

References

Year of birth missing (living people)
Living people
Fellows of the American Physical Society
American business executives
21st-century American physicists
California Institute of Technology alumni
Princeton University alumni